IdentiGEN Ltd. is an Ireland-based company providing DNA Based analysis and diagnostics with operations in Ireland, UK, North America and Canada. Services range from Species identification to parentage testing, as well as their proprietary Traceability system, DNA TraceBack®.

History 
IdentiGEN was founded in 1996 as a spin-out from world class research conducted at Trinity College, Dublin. Among the first to apply molecular genetic techniques to source-verify meat products, the company pioneered the use of this technology to improve food traceability and supply chain transparency.

DNA TraceBack 
This food traceability system uses DNA sampling to track product through the entire supply chain from each individual animal. Until now, Track and trace systems have provided the highest level of transparency about product. DNA analysis has become the next step in providing retailers and processors with assurances about origin and product claims.

See also 
 Traceability
 2013 meat adulteration scandal

References

External links 
identigen.com

Health care companies of Ireland